Georgia Andreea Crăciun (born 14 July 1999) is a Romanian professional tennis player.

Crăciun has won 10 singles and 12 doubles titles on the ITF Circuit. On 24 February 2020, she achieved a career-high singles ranking of world No. 347. On 10 February 2020, she peaked at No. 461 in the doubles rankings.

Crăciun made her WTA Tour main-draw debut at the 2017 BRD Bucharest Open, receiving a wildcard entry in the doubles event, partnering fellow Romanian Alexandra Dulgheru. The pair lost in the first round to the second-seeds Elise Mertens and Demi Schuurs.

ITF Circuit finals

Singles: 15 (10 titles, 5 runner–ups)

Doubles: 14 (12 titles, 2 runner–ups)

References

External links
 
 

Romanian female tennis players
Sportspeople from Brăila
1999 births
Living people
21st-century Romanian women